Jake "Shake" Davis was a 62-year-old African-American man who was lynched in Miller County, Georgia by a white mob on July 14, 1922. According to the United States Senate Committee on the Judiciary it was the 38th of 61 lynchings during 1922 in the United States.

Background
Miscegenation is the interbreeding of people who are considered to be members of different races and was heavily frowned upon in the American south. The historical taboo surrounding white–black relationships among American whites can be seen as a historical consequence of the oppression and racial segregation of African Americans. In many U.S. states, interracial marriage was already illegal when the term miscegenation was coined in 1863. Before that, it was called "amalgamation". 

Interracial relationships were heavily frowned upon and legal bans on Interracial marriages weren't struck down until the Loving v. Virginia case. This was a landmark civil rights decision of the U.S. Supreme Court in which the Court ruled, on June 12, 1967,  that laws banning interracial marriage violate the Equal Protection and Due Process Clauses of the Fourteenth Amendment to the U.S. Constitution. This case was necessary as bans on interracial relationships were not repealed like other Jim Crow laws by the Civil Rights Act of 1964.

Lynching

Local media reported that the well-known, 62-year-old African-American, Jake Davis had a relationship with white 26-year-old Ethel Skittel. This relationship resulted in a child. When the Miller County, Georgia community found out about this relationship a white mob gathered, seized Davis and hanged him. 

After the event the Miller County Liberal wrote that "hundreds of the citizens throughout the county regret this lynching. Many have said [Ethel Skittel] was guiltier than was Jake."

National memorial 

The National Memorial for Peace and Justice opened in Montgomery, Alabama, on April 26, 2018. Featured among other things is the Memorial Corridor which displays 805 hanging steel rectangles, each representing the counties in the United States where a documented lynching took place and, for each county, the names of those lynched. The memorial hopes that communities, like Miller County, Georgia where Jake Davis was lynched, will take these slabs and install them in their own communities.

See also 
List of lynching victims in the United States

Bibliography  
Notes

References

 

1922 deaths
1922 in Georgia (U.S. state)
1922 murders in the United States
African-American history between emancipation and the civil rights movement
American murder victims
Crimes in Georgia (U.S. state)
July 1922 events
Miller County, Georgia
Lynching deaths in Georgia (U.S. state)
Murdered African-American people
People murdered in Georgia (U.S. state)
Prisoners murdered in custody
Racially motivated violence against African Americans
White American riots in the United States